The fifth season of the American television series Bones premiered on September 17, 2009, and concluded on May 20, 2010, on Fox. The show maintained its previous time slot, airing on Thursdays at 8:00 pm ET for the entire season. The season consisted of 22 episodes and averaged 10 million viewers.

Cast and characters

Main cast 
Emily Deschanel as Dr. Temperance "Bones" Brennan, a forensic anthropologist
David Boreanaz as FBI Special Agent Seeley Booth, who is the official FBI liaison with the Jeffersonian
Michaela Conlin as Angela Montenegro, a forensic artist
Tamara Taylor as Dr. Camille Saroyan, a forensic pathologist and the head of the forensic division
T. J. Thyne as Dr. Jack Hodgins, an entomologist
John Francis Daley as Dr. Lance Sweets, an FBI psychologist, who provides psychological reports on criminals and staff including Brennan and Booth

Recurring cast 
Patricia Belcher as Caroline Julian, a prosecutor
Diedrich Bader as FBI Assistant Director Andrew Hacker
Tiffany Hines as Michelle Welton, Cam's adopted daughter
Ryan O'Neal as Max Keenan, Brennan's father
Ty Panitz as Parker Booth, Booth's son
Zooey Deschanel as Margaret Whitesell, Brennan's relative
Brendan Fehr as Jared Booth, Booth's brother
Stephen Fry as Dr. Gordon Wyatt, Booth's former psychiatrist
Billy Gibbons as Angela's father
Elon Gold as Dr. Paul Lidner, Cam's boyfriend
Cyndi Lauper as Avalon Harmonia, a psychic
Deirdre Lovejoy as Heather Taffet
Eric Millegan as Dr. Zack Addy
Dilshad Vadsaria as Padme Dalaj, Jared's wife
Ralph Waite as Hank Booth, Seeley's grandfather

Interns
Eugene Byrd as Dr. Clark Edison
Carla Gallo as Daisy Wick
Michael Grant Terry as Wendell Bray
Pej Vahdat as Arastoo Vaziri
Ryan Cartwright as Vincent Nigel-Murray
Joel David Moore as Colin Fisher

Storyline

Key plotlines in the fifth season include the 100th episode (directed by David Boreanaz), which flashes back to Booth and Brennan's first assignment that showcases their original relationship, which leads Booth to confess his true feelings to Brennan. The 100th episode also features the return of Eric Millegan as Zack Addy. Angela and Hodgins rekindle their love after spending some quality time together in a jail cell, and decide to get married. Heather Taffet aka the Gravedigger is put on trial for her crimes, and the team's strong case against her leads to a conviction where she is finally put away, but warns Brennan "that it's not over". In the season finale, many of the characters begin to embark on trips that will take them out of the country for one year, intending to return and pick things up where they left off one year from that day. Temperance, along with Daisy Wick, go to the Maluku Islands to study a full set of interspecies hominid remains that could be a crucial link in the evolutionary chain. Booth returns to the Army as a Sergeant Major to train soldiers in apprehending insurgents. Meanwhile, newlywed Angela and Hodgins decide to travel.

The season was originally supposed to include a black-and-white noir-inspired episode, but the idea was dropped after another Fox series, Fringe, did a similar episode. The episode "The Gamer in the Grease" features promotion of the film Avatar. The cross promotion was suggested by Avatar producer Jon Landau and the episode features recurring actor Joel David Moore, who also appears in Avatar as one of the secondary protagonists.

Episodes

DVD and Blu-ray release 
The fifth season of Bones was released on DVD and Blu-ray (subtitled "Beyond the Grave Edition") in region 1 on October 5, 2010, in region 2 on October 18, 2010 and in region 4 on October 27, 2010. The set includes all 22 episodes of season five on a 6-disc DVD set and 4-disc Blu-ray set presented in anamorphic widescreen. Special features include two audio commentaries—"The Proof in the Pudding" by actors Tamara Taylor, John Francis Daley and Michaela Conlin and "The Beginning in the End" by executive producers Hart Hanson, Stephen Nathan and Ian Toynton. Featurettes include "The 100th Episode with Director David Boreanaz", "The Bodies of Bones" and "The Nunchuck Way". Also included are extended versions of "The Tough Man in the Tender Chicken" and "The X in the File", as well as deleted scenes and a gag reel.

References 

General references

External links 
 
 

Season 05
2009 American television seasons
2010 American television seasons